The Ferrari Daytona, officially designated the Ferrari 365 GTB/4, is a two-seat grand tourer  by Ferrari from 1968 to 1973. It was offered in berlinetta and spyder forms.

The Daytona was succeeded by the mid-engined 365 GT4 Berlinetta Boxer in 1973.

Name
The unofficial Daytona name is reported to have been applied by the media rather than Ferrari and commemorates Ferrari's 1-2-3 finish in the February 1967 24 Hours of Daytona with a 330 P3/4, a 330 P4 and a 412 P. To this day, Ferrari itself only rarely refers to the 365 as the "Daytona", and refers to it as an "unofficial" name.

Specifications

Unlike Lamborghini's then-new, mid-engined Miura, the Daytona was a traditional front-engined, rear-drive car.
For the American version, slight modifications were made - the compression ratio was reduced to 8.8:1 and the exhaust system was equipped with a large central silencer, necessitating visible alterations to the primary pipes.

The five-speed manual transmission (of the transaxle concept) was mounted in the rear for optimal weight distribution, and a four-wheel independent suspension featured wishbones and coil springs.

Styling

Pininfarina designer Leonardo Fioravanti, who had previously worked on the Dino Ferrari's styling, was responsible for the 365 GTB/4. It reflected a movement from Ferrari's traditional rounded designs to a more contemporary, sharp-edged look.

Early Daytonas featured fixed headlights behind an acrylic glass cover. A new U.S. safety regulation banning headlights behind covers resulted in retractable pop-up twin headlights in 1971.

Model variations

365 GTB/4 and GTS/4

The generally accepted total number of Daytonas from the Ferrari club historians is 1,406 over the life of the model. This figure includes 156 UK right-hand-drive coupés, 122 factory-made spyders (of which 7 are right hand drive), and 15 competition cars. The competition cars are divided into three series, all with modified lightweight bodies and in various degrees of engine tune. All bodies except the first Pininfarina prototype were produced by Italian coachbuilder Scaglietti, which already had a well established record of working with Ferrari.

Historically, and especially since the mid-1980s and early 1990s, there has mostly been a considerable market price difference between a real berlinetta and a real spyder. Many berlinettas were turned into spyders by aftermarket mechanics, often to increase the car's monetary value or simply because of the owner's preference for an open car. Differences in value have typically remained, however, even after the most skillful conversions.

Coachbuilt derivatives

365 GTB/4 Shooting Brake 

The stock 365 GTB/4 was delivered new to Philadelphia-area Ferrari dealer Chinetti-Garthwaite Motors as the 805th 365 GTB/4 produced with chassis no. 15275. It's there that architect Bob Gittleman asked Luigi Chinetti Jr. to design a unique car for him. Mr. Chinetti had already designed a Ferrari 330 GT 2+2 modified by Vignale and decided to design a shooting brake. The car was then sent to Surrey in England where Panther Westwinds built the car according to Mr. Chinetti's designs. The car was listed at Gooding and Co's 2016 Pebble Beach auction with less than 4,500 miles and an $750,000 - $1,000,000 estimate. The car didn't sell then.

Competition versions

The first racing version of the 365GTB/4 was prepared in 1969: an aluminium bodied car was built and entered in the Le Mans 24-hour race that year (the car crashed in practice). Ferrari did not produce an official competition car until late in 1970.

The official cars were built in three batches of five cars each, in 1970–1, 1972 and 1973. They all featured a lightweight body making use of aluminium and fibreglass panels, with plexiglas windows.

The cars were not raced by the official Scuderia Ferrari team, but by a range of private entrants. They enjoyed particular success in the 24 Hours of Le Mans, with results including a 5th overall in 1971, followed by GT class wins in 1972, 1973 and 1974. In 1972 Ferrari 365 GTB/4s took the first 5 places of the GT class.

The final major success of the car was in 1979 (five years after production ended), when a 1973 car achieved a class victory (2nd overall) in the 24 Hours of Daytona.

Legacy
In 1971, the Daytona gained fame when one was driven by Dan Gurney and Brock Yates in the inaugural Cannonball Baker Sea-To-Shining-Sea Memorial Trophy Dash. Gurney was later quoted as saying "We never once exceeded 175 miles per hour."

It appears on the cover of 1973's Now & Then, the fifth studio album of the American pop band The Carpenters.

In the 1980s, a Daytona replica was prominently featured on the first two seasons of NBC's hit television series Miami Vice. The black car seen in early episodes was a kit car built on a Corvette C3 chassis. Altogether, two nearly identical cars were used simultaneously in the production of the TV series. Ferrari was not pleased that its company and one of their products was represented on TV by an imitation car and sued the manufacturer of the kit for trademark infringement and trademark dilution. The Daytona replicas were retired at the beginning of the show's third season and replaced by two Ferrari-donated Testarossas, the company's newest flagship model at the time.

In 2004, the Daytona was voted top sports car of the 1970s by Sports Car International magazine.  Similarly, Motor Trend Classic named the 365 GTB/4 and GTS/4 as number two in their list of the ten "Greatest Ferraris of all time".

See also
 Maserati Ghibli
 Lamborghini Miura
 De Tomaso Mangusta
 Iso Grifo
 Bizzarrini Strada

References

Bibliography

External links

 365gtc4.com

Daytona
Grand tourers
Cars introduced in 1968
1970s cars
Pininfarina
Miami Vice